Sreshthavarman was the second king of Chenla.

Biography 
King Shreshthavarman was the son of King Shrutavarman. He was the founder of the capital, Sreshthapura, at the foot of the mountain where Prasat Vat Phou located. He was the father of Queen Kambujarajalakshmi and the father-in-law of King Bhavavarman I.

References

Cambodian monarchs
6th-century Cambodian monarchs